Elections to Ballymena Borough Council were held on 17 May 1989 on the same day as the other Northern Irish local government elections. The election used four district electoral areas to elect a total of 23 councillors.

Election results

Note: "Votes" are the first preference votes.

Districts summary

|- class="unsortable" align="centre"
!rowspan=2 align="left"|Ward
! % 
!Cllrs
! % 
!Cllrs
! %
!Cllrs
! %
!Cllrs
! %
!Cllrs
!rowspan=2|TotalCllrs
|- class="unsortable" align="center"
!colspan=2 bgcolor="" | DUP
!colspan=2 bgcolor="" | UUP
!colspan=2 bgcolor="" | SDLP
!colspan=2 bgcolor="" | Alliance
!colspan=2 bgcolor="white"| Others
|-
|align="left"|Ballymena Town
|bgcolor="#D46A4C"|26.8
|bgcolor="#D46A4C"|2
|23.7
|2
|21.8
|1
|14.0
|1
|13.7
|1
|7
|-
|align="left"|Braid Valley
|40.9
|2
|bgcolor="40BFF5"|41.7
|bgcolor="40BFF5"|2
|0.0
|0
|0.0
|0
|17.4
|1
|5
|-
|align="left"|Kells Water
|bgcolor="#D46A4C"|58.7
|bgcolor="#D46A4C"|4
|36.5
|2
|0.0
|0
|0.0
|0
|4.8
|0
|6
|-
|align="left"|The Main
|bgcolor="#D46A4C"|56.6
|bgcolor="#D46A4C"|4
|23.7
|1
|11.4
|0
|8.3
|0
|0.0
|0
|5
|-
|- class="unsortable" class="sortbottom" style="background:#C9C9C9"
|align="left"| Total
|44.8
|12
|30.8
|7
|9.2
|1
|6.1
|1
|9.1
|2
|23
|-
|}

Districts results

Ballymena Town

1985: 3 x DUP, 2 x UUP, 1 x SDLP, 1 x Independent Unionist
1989: 2 x DUP, 2 x UUP, 1 x SDLP, 1 x Alliance, 1 x Independent Unionist
1985-1989 Change: Alliance gain from DUP

Braid Valley

1985: 3 x DUP, 2 x UUP
1989: 2 x DUP, 2 x UUP, 1 x Independent
1985-1989 Change: Independent gain from DUP

Kells Water

1985: 5 x DUP, 1 x UUP
1989: 4 x DUP, 2 x UUP
1985-1989 Change: UUP gain from DUP

The Main

1985: 4 x DUP, 1 x UUP
1989: 4 x DUP, 1 x UUP
1985-1989 Change: No change

References

Ballymena Borough Council elections
Ballymena